The Telița is a river in Tulcea County, Romania. Near Zebil it discharges into Lake Babadag, which is connected with Lake Razim, a former lagoon of the Black Sea.

References

Rivers of Romania
0Telita
Rivers of Tulcea County